Kelvin Onosiughe (born 2 May 1992) is a footballer who plays as a central midfielder for Albanian First Division club KF Turbina Cërrik. Born and raised in Nigeria, he has been naturalized by Equatorial Guinea in order to play for that national team.

Biography
Onosiughe was born in Lagos, a port and the most populous conurbation in Nigeria.

International career
In October 2010, Onosiughe received his first call for the Equatoguinean senior team and participated in a friendly lost against Botswana by 0–2 in Malabo on 12 October 2010, and he also participated and scored his first Goal for the Equatorial Guinea under 23 at the London 2011 Olympic qualification African zone against Nigeria the game ended 1–4 in Malabo on 10 April 2011.

References

External links
 
 
 

1992 births
Living people
Association football midfielders
Equatoguinean footballers
Equatorial Guinea international footballers
Nigerian footballers
Sportspeople from Lagos
Bridge F.C. players
CD Binéfar players
Nigerian expatriate footballers
Nigerian expatriate sportspeople in Spain
Expatriate footballers in Spain
Nigerian expatriate sportspeople in Finland
Expatriate footballers in Finland
Nigerian expatriate sportspeople in Sweden
Expatriate footballers in Sweden
Nigerian expatriate sportspeople in Albania
Expatriate footballers in Albania
Naturalized citizens of Equatorial Guinea